The 1906–07 season was the 36th season of competitive football in England.

Honours

League tables

First Division

Second Division

References